Ojrzeń  is a village in Ciechanów County, Masovian Voivodeship, in east-central Poland. It is the seat of the gmina (administrative district) called Gmina Ojrzeń.

The village has a population of 750.

References

Villages in Ciechanów County